The 2007 Primera B de Chile was the 57th completed season of the Primera B de Chile.

Table

See also
Chilean football league system

References

External links
 RSSSF 2007

Primera B de Chile seasons
Primera B
Chil